Francis Rogers "Governor" Ellerbe (December 25, 1895 – July 8, 1988) was a professional baseball third baseman who played in Major League Baseball (MLB) for the Washington Senators, St. Louis Browns and the Cleveland Indians between 1919 and 1924.

In 420 games over six seasons, Ellerbe posted a .268 batting average (389-for-1453) with 179 runs, 4 home runs and 152 RBI. He finished his career with a .947 fielding percentage.

External links

1895 births
1988 deaths
Washington Senators (1901–1960) players
St. Louis Browns players
Cleveland Indians players
Major League Baseball third basemen
People from Marion County, South Carolina